Morten Arnfred (born 2 August 1945) is a Danish film director and screenwriter. His 1983 film Der er et yndigt land was entered into the 33rd Berlin International Film Festival, where it won an Honourable Mention. Ten years later, his film The Russian Singer was entered into the 43rd Berlin International Film Festival. He also co-direct the miniseries trilogy Riget with Lars von Trier.

Selected filmography
 Me and Charly (1978)
 Johnny Larsen (1979)
 Der er et yndigt land (1983)
 Riget (1994-1997)
 Beck – Spår i mörker (1997)
 The Russian Singer (1993)
 Move Me (2003)

References

External links
 
 

1945 births
Living people
Danish male screenwriters
Film directors from Copenhagen